Peter Szmidt (born August 12, 1961) was a Canadian swimmer, competing in the freestyle events during the late 1970s and early 1980s.

Szmidt competed at the 1984 Summer Olympics and was supposed to represent his native country at the 1980 Summer Olympics, but didn't start due to the international boycott of the Moscow Games. A resident of Sarnia, Ontario he won a total number of three medals at the 1979 Pan American Games.

On July 15, 1980, at the Canadian Olympic trials, Szmidt set the world record for  400-meter freestyle with a time of 3:50:49.  He held the world record at the time of the 1980 Olympics, in which he did not race due to the boycott.  The world record stood for 18 months and was a Canadian record for 20 years.

Szmidt swam in competition with Russian swimmer Vladimir Salnikov, who dominated long-distance freestyle swimming in the late 1970s and early 1980s.  Szmidt's 400-metre record was the only interruption in Salnikov's title as the world record-holder for 400-meter freestyle from 1979 through 1985.

At the 1984 Summer Olympics, Szmidt was a member of the Canadian Men's 4 × 200 metre freestyle relay and finished fifth in the final.

See also
 List of Commonwealth Games medallists in swimming (men)
 World record progression 400 metres freestyle

References

External links
 

1961 births
Living people
Canadian male freestyle swimmers
World record setters in swimming
Olympic swimmers of Canada
Sportspeople from Sarnia
Swimmers from Montreal
Swimmers at the 1978 Commonwealth Games
Swimmers at the 1979 Pan American Games
Swimmers at the 1983 Pan American Games
Swimmers at the 1984 Summer Olympics
Commonwealth Games medallists in swimming
Pan American Games silver medalists for Canada
Pan American Games bronze medalists for Canada
Commonwealth Games gold medallists for Canada
Commonwealth Games silver medallists for Canada
Commonwealth Games bronze medallists for Canada
Pan American Games medalists in swimming
Medalists at the 1979 Pan American Games
Universiade medalists in swimming
Universiade bronze medalists for Canada
Medalists at the 1983 Summer Universiade
Medallists at the 1978 Commonwealth Games